Events from the year 1633 in Sweden

Incumbents
 Monarch – Christina

Events

 Axel Oxenstierna appointed Sweden's ambassador in Germany for three years. 
 Alliance between Sweden and the Protestant states of south-west Germany.
 Swedish victory at Battle of Oldendorf
 Swedish victory at Battle of Pfaffenhofen.
 Swedish defeat at Battle of Steinau.
 Swedish occupation of Regensburg.
 Foundation of the Allmänna Barnhuset.

Births

 Anna Gyllander, impostor (died unknown year)

Deaths

 Magnus Brahe (1564–1633), Lord High Constable and Lord High Steward (born 1564) 
 Sigrid of Sweden (1566–1633), princess (born 1566) 
 Virginia Eriksdotter, illegitimate royal daughter (born 1559)

References

 
Years of the 17th century in Sweden
Sweden